New York City's 7th City Council district is one of 51 districts in the New York City Council. It is currently represented by Democrat Shaun Abreu, who took office in 2022.

Geography
District 7 covers a series of small neighborhoods in upper Manhattan, including Hamilton Heights, Morningside Heights, Manhattanville, Manhattan Valley, and parts of Washington Heights and the Upper West Side. Columbia University, Riverside Church, Grant's Tomb, Morningside Park, and the northern half of Riverside Park are all located within the district.

The district overlaps with Manhattan Community Boards 7, 9, and 12 and with New York's 10th and 13th congressional districts. It also overlaps with the 30th and 31st districts of the New York State Senate, and with the 69th, 70th, and 71st districts of the New York State Assembly.

Recent election results

2021
In 2019, voters in New York City approved Ballot Question 1, which implemented ranked-choice voting in all local elections. Under the new system, voters have the option to rank up to five candidates for every local office. Voters whose first-choice candidates fare poorly will have their votes redistributed to other candidates in their ranking until one candidate surpasses the 50 percent threshold. If one candidate surpasses 50 percent in first-choice votes, then ranked-choice tabulations will not occur.

2017

2013

References

New York City Council districts